Pierre Pêcher (born 15 April 1907) was a Belgian fencer. He competed in the individual and team foil events at the 1928 Summer Olympics.

References

External links
  

1907 births
Year of death missing
Belgian male fencers
Belgian foil fencers
Olympic fencers of Belgium
Fencers at the 1928 Summer Olympics